Alex Haydock-Wilson (born 28 July 1999) is a British athlete who competes in the 400 metres.

Haydock-Wilson studied at the University of Loughborough in Materials Science and Engineering. In 2022 he was awarded a first-class degree, and started his PhD in photovoltaic technology. 

Haydock-Wilson was a member of the British 4 x 400 metre relay team that won bronze at the 2018 IAAF World U20 Championships. In 2019, he won a bronze medal in the 400m at the British indoor senior championships.

At the 2022 World Athletics Championships Haydock-Wilson qualified from the heats to reach the semi finals of the men's 400 metres where he ran a new personal best time. He also competed in the mixed 4 x 400 metres relay.

At the 2022 European Championships he won bronze in the finals of the men's 400 metres, and gold in the finals of the men's 4 x 400 metres relay.

References

1999 births
Living people
British male sprinters
English male sprinters
World Athletics Championships athletes for Great Britain
20th-century British people
21st-century British people
Black British sportsmen
European Athletics Championships winners